Chapiquilta is a Chilean town. It is located in Camiña in the Province of Tamarugal, Region of Tarapacá, Chile. It is located 197 km from the city of Iquique.

References 

Populated places in Tarapacá Region
Communes of Chile